The Algerian Women's Cup is a women's association football competition in Algeria. pitting regional teams against each other.  It was established in 1998. It is the women's equivalent of the Algerian Cup for men. AS Sûreté Nationale won the last edition for the third time.

History
The competition started on 1998. The first winners was Flambeau de Blida.

Finals

Most successful clubs

See also 
 Algerian Women's Championship
 Algerian Women's League Cup
 Algerian Women's Super Cup

References

External links 
 Algeria (Women), List of Cup Winners - rsssf.com

 
Alg
Women's football competitions in Algeria
Cup
1998 establishments in Algeria